The 1977–78 FAW Welsh Cup is the 91st season of the annual knockout tournament for competitive football teams in Wales.

Key
League name pointed after clubs name.
CCL - Cheshire County League
FL D2 - Football League Second Division
FL D3 - Football League Third Division
FL D4 - Football League Fourth Division
NPL - Northern Premier League
SFL - Southern Football League
WLN - Welsh League North
WLS - Welsh League South

Fourth round
Nine winners from the Third round and seven new clubs.

Fifth round

Semifinal

Final

External links
The FAW Welsh Cup

1977-78
Wales
Cup